Saint Marie-Hermine of Jesus (1866–1900, born Irma Grivot) was a French nun and Mother Superior who died for her faith in China during the Boxer Rebellion and was canonised in 2000. She and six other nuns had gone to China to create a small hospital and to staff an orphanage. She is one of the group known as the Martyr Saints of China who were canonised by Pope John Paul II 1 October 2000.

Life
She was born Irma Grivot on 28 April 1866 in Beaune, France, and she had only a basic education. Her father made barrels and he and her mother did not support her ambition to lead a religious life. She first took a job as a tutor to gain her independence and she joined the Franciscan Missionaries of Mary in a prenovitiate in 1894 at Vanves. She went on to her novitiate at Le Châtelet and this took some time as she was frequently ill.  

In 1899 she was the mother superior of a group of seven sisters from the order who left Marseilles on 12 May 1899. They went to Taiyuan, China, arriving on 4 May 1899, to set up an orphanage at the mission there under bishop Gregorio Grassi. The seven nuns were from France, Italy, Belgium and the Netherlands. Marie de la Paix Giuliani who was Italian and who was the youngest of the nuns became Mother Superior Marie-Hermine of Jesus's assistant. The nuns who left China were aware of the dangers as the Boxers had already killed other missionaries. They would be there during the Boxer Rebellion which was a violent, anti-Christian, and anti-imperialist insurrection that ran from 1899 to 1901.

On 27 June 1900 the missionaries realised they were in peril and their Bishops advised that the sisters should remove their habits and escape in plain clothes. Marie-Hermine of Jesus as Mother Superior protested that the sisters should be allowed to stay and take the risk of being killed for their faith.

On 5 July 1900, the Christians at the mission were told that they would be killed if they did not renounce their faith. Four days later the priests, nuns, seminarians and Christian lay workers were all murdered as part of what was callerd the Taiyuan massacre. It is estimated that 250 foreigners died during the Boxer rebellion. Some of these were embassy staff, but most were missionaries. It is thought that 100,000 Chinese people may have died.

Marie-Hermine was beatified by Pope Pius XII on 24 November 1946 and canonised by Pope John Paul II on 1 October 2000 as one of a group of 120 Martyr Saints of China.

References

Further reading
Life of Mother Marie-Hermine of Jesus, Massacred in Shan-si (China) July 9th, 1900, Anonymous, published 1910, full text; reprinted 2018, Forgotten Books, 

1866 births
1900 deaths
French Roman Catholic saints
Christian female saints of the Late Modern era
Canonizations by Pope John Paul II
People from Beaune
19th-century French nuns
Franciscan Missionaries of Mary
19th-century Roman Catholic martyrs
French people of the Boxer Rebellion
19th-century Christian saints